Senna covesii (desert senna, Coues' senna, rattleweed, rattlebox, dais, or cove senna) is a perennial subshrub in the family Fabaceae, native to the Mojave Desert and Sonoran Desert in southeastern California, southern Nevada, and Arizona in the United States, and northern Baja California in Mexico. It is found on desert plains and in sandy washes between 500 and 600 m above sea level, and is very common in Joshua Tree National Park. The specific epithet honors ornithologist Elliott Coues.

It grows to 30–60 cm tall, and is leafless most of the year. The leaves are pinnate, 3–7 cm long, with two or three pairs of leaflets (no terminal leaflet); the leaflets are elliptical, 1.0-2.5 cm long. The flowers are yellow in color, with five rounded petals about 12 mm long.

This shrub is often planted by landscapers and as part of roadside wildflower programs.  Flowers are visited by carpenter bees and bumblebees.  Sulphur butterflies use the plant as a larval food source.

References

 Fiero, Brad (2001): Desert Ecology of Tucson, AZ - Desert Senna (Senna covesii). Version of 2001-AUG-01. Retrieved 2007-DEC-20.
 McClintock, Elizabeth (1993): Senna covesii. In: : The Jepson Manual: Higher Plants of California. University of California Press, Berkeley.  HTML fulltext
 Stewart, Jon Mark (1998): Mojave Desert Wildflowers: p. 73. Jon Stewart Photography.

External links
 USDA Plants Profile
 Photo gallery

covesii
North American desert flora
Flora of the California desert regions
Flora of the Sonoran Deserts